Allan Masaharu Ohata (September 13, 1918 – October 17, 1977) was a United States Army soldier.  He is best known for receiving the Medal of Honor because of his actions in World War II.

Early life 
Ohata was born in Hawaii to Japanese immigrant parents. He was a Nisei, which means that he was a second generation Japanese-American.

Soldier
One month before the Japanese attack on Pearl Harbor, Ohata joined the US Army in November 1941.

Ohata volunteered to be part of the all-Nisei 100th Infantry Battalion. which was mostly made up of Japanese Americans from Hawaii. 
He was originally awarded the Distinguished Service Cross.  According to the story he shared with his brother, "[H]e held a hill by himself and a lot of people died except him. He said the enemy came from both sides, and [at] one point he came from one side and the enemy soldier came from the other end. The only reason he lived was because he saw the guy first."

Medal of Honor citation

Sergeant Allan M. Ohata distinguished himself by extraordinary heroism in action on 29 and November 30, 1943, near Cerasuolo, Italy. Sergeant Ohata, his squad leader, and three men were ordered to protect his platoon's left flank against an attacking enemy force of 40 men, armed with machine guns, machine pistols, and rifles. He posted one of his men, an automatic rifleman, on the extreme left, 15 yards from his own position. Taking his position, Sergeant Ohata delivered effective fire against the advancing enemy. The man to his left called for assistance when his automatic rifle was shot and damaged. With utter disregard for his personal safety, Sergeant Ohata left his position and advanced 15 yards through heavy machine gun fire. Reaching his comrade's position, he immediately fired upon the enemy, killing 10 enemy soldiers and successfully covering his comrade's withdrawal to replace his damaged weapon. Sergeant Ohata and the automatic rifleman held their position and killed 37 enemy soldiers. Both men then charged the three remaining soldiers and captured them. Later, Sergeant Ohata and the automatic rifleman stopped another attacking force of 14, killing four and wounding three while the others fled. The following day he and the automatic rifleman held their flank with grim determination and staved off all attacks. Staff Sergeant Ohata's extraordinary heroism and devotion to duty are in keeping with the highest traditions of military service and reflect great credit on him, his unit, and the United States Army.

See also

List of Medal of Honor recipients for World War II
442nd Regimental Combat Team

References

External links
 "Army Secretary Lionizes 22 World War II Heroes" at Defense.gov
 

United States Army personnel of World War II
United States Army Medal of Honor recipients
1918 births
1977 deaths
American military personnel of Japanese descent
People from Honolulu
Recipients of the Distinguished Service Cross (United States)
World War II recipients of the Medal of Honor
Burials in the National Memorial Cemetery of the Pacific